Yahaya Maikori is a Nigerian entertainment lawyer. He is the founder of the law firm Law Allianz and the co-founder of the record label Chocolate City.

Education
Yahaya Maikori is a graduate of Obafemi Awolowo University. He earned his Bachelor of Laws degree from Nigerian Law School in 1993, and gained admission to the Nigerian Bar Association. Maikori got his Master of Laws degree from the University of London in 2010.

Career
Maikori started his legal career as the legal advisor to ASO Savings & Loans and later worked as the company's secretary for First Alliance Pension and Benefits. Maikori co-founded the record label Chocolate City in 2005, along with his brother Audu Maikori and business partner Paul Okeugo. Chocolate City has managed the careers of artists such as M.I, Femi Kuti, Ice Prince, DJ Caise, Pryse, Nosa, Victoria Kimani, Dice Ailes, Koker, Brymo and Jesse Jagz. Yahaya Maikori founded and became the Senior Partner of the law firm Law Allianz, which covers entertainment law.

As an entertainment lawyer, Maikori is on the entertainment committee of Nigerian Bar Association, the copyright law review committee of the Nigerian Copyright Commission, and is an alternate director in Nigeria's copyrights society. He spoke at South by Southwest in 2013 on a panel called "CLE 6: International Creative Lawyering and Future Growth." Additionally, Maikori has spoken at other events, including the Betting and iGaming BiG Africa Summit and Exhibition in 2014.

References

Living people
Nigerian businesspeople
20th-century Nigerian lawyers
Nigerian music industry executives
Alumni of the University of London
Year of birth missing (living people)
People from Kaduna State
21st-century Nigerian lawyers